Andreas Sundin (born June 9, 1984, in Ånge, Sweden) is a former professional Swedish ice hockey player. He was a who forward played for Bofors IK who is now named BIK Karlskoga in HockeyAllsvenskan. The last club he played for was Mjölby HC in the swedish Division 2.

Career statistics

References

External links 

1984 births
Living people
Swedish ice hockey left wingers
Linköping HC players
Nybro Vikings players
VIK Västerås HK players
Bofors IK players
Detroit Red Wings draft picks
Sportspeople from Linköping
Sportspeople from Östergötland County